Leucoagaricus rubrotinctus is a widespread species of fungus in the family Agaricaceae. It was described as new to science in 1884 by American mycologist Charles Horton Peck as Agaricus rubrotinctus. Rolf Singer transferred it to the genus Leucoagaricus in 1948. The fungus may be a complex of several closely related species. It is inedible.

The cap is reddish brown and convex to flat. The margin splits and causes lines of the whitish flesh to darken. The gills are white and do not stain. The stipe is whitish and enlarged at the base, with a fragile ring.

References

rubrotinctus
Fungi described in 1884
Fungi of North America
Inedible fungi
Taxa named by Charles Horton Peck